Jacob Dahl Jürgensen (born 1975 in Copenhagen, Denmark) is an artist based in Copenhagen, Denmark).

Jürgensen works in sculpture, digital printmaking, collage and installation, amongst other media.

He is represented by Croy Nielsen, Berlin.

External links 
 Artist's own website
 Croy Nielsen
 The Saatchi Gallery
 Artfacts.net

1975 births
Danish installation artists
Living people
Date of birth missing (living people)